Tooloombah is a rural town in the Livingstone Shire, Queensland, Australia. It is within the locality of Ogmore.

History 
Town lots were sold in Tooloombah in June 1862.

References 

Shire of Livingstone
Towns in Queensland